Scuppernong River Bridge, also known as the  Main Street Bridge, Tyrrell County No. 4 Bridge, and Columbia Bridge, is a historic bridge located at Columbia, Tyrrell County, North Carolina.  It was built in 1926, and is a 566-foot-long, two-lane bridge.  Spanning the Scuppernong River, it consists of a steel Warren-type pony truss swing span measuring 123 feet long, and 22 concrete pile-supported timber approach spans.  It is the only manually-operated pony truss swing-span bridge remaining in North Carolina.

It was listed on the National Register of Historic Places in 1992.

References

Road bridges on the National Register of Historic Places in North Carolina
Bridges completed in 1926
Buildings and structures in Tyrrell County, North Carolina
National Register of Historic Places in Tyrrell County, North Carolina
Steel bridges in the United States
Warren truss bridges in the United States
1926 establishments in North Carolina